Gurdwara Janam Asthan (Punjabi ,; Punjabi : ਗੁਰਦੁਆਰਾ ਜਨਮ ਅਸਥਾਨ), also referred to as Gurdwara Nankana Sahib, is a highly revered gurdwara that is situated at the site where the founder of Sikhism, Guru Nanak, was born. The shrine is located in Nankana Sahib, Punjab, Pakistan.

Location
The shrine is located in the town of Nankana Sahib, approximately 65 kilometres from Lahore. Nankana Sahib had previously been known as Rāi Bhoi Kī Talvaṇḍī, but was eventually renamed in honour of Guru Nanak.

Significance
Gurdwara Janam Asthan is believed to be located at the site where Guru Nanak was born to Mehta Kalu and Mata Tripta.

The gurdwara forms part of an ensemble of nine important gurdwaras in Nankana Sahib. The shrine is frequently visited by Sikh yatris as part of a pilgrimage route in Pakistan.

History
The first gurdwara is believed to have been built at the site in the 16th century by the grandson of Guru Nanak, Baba Dharam Chand. The current gurdwara was built by Ranjit Singh in the 19th century.

1921 Massacre
86 Sikhs were killed during the 20 February 1921 Nankana massacre, which took place after a confrontation between supporters of the gurdwara's manager, Mahant Narayan Das, and members of the reformist Akali movement who accused him of both corruption and sexual impropriety.

Conservation
The gurdwara complex is listed on the Protected Heritage Monuments of the Archaeology Department of Punjab.

Gallery

See also
 Gurdwara Darbar Sahib Kartarpur - Gurdwara built at the site where Guru Nanak died.
 Saka - The Martyrs of Nankana Sahib

References

External links

Gurdwaras in Pakistan
Religious buildings and structures in Punjab, Pakistan
Religious buildings and structures with domes
Guru Nanak Dev